The Rembrandt Affair is a 2010 spy novel by Daniel Silva.
It is the tenth in the Gabriel Allon series, based in the world of Israeli intelligence.

Plot
Gabriel Allon and his team seek a lost Rembrandt whose previous owners have included both Holocaust victims and terrorists. In addition to regularly recurring characters, Julian Isherwood in his role as a gallery owner features prominently.

Background

Part of the reason that Silva delved into the topic of art theft was the realization of the impact it has on the art world. Beginning with the role it played during and after the Holocaust,  art theft has continued into the present. Each year, between four and six billion dollars' worth of art and antiquities are stolen, ranking it as the fourth-most lucrative crime behind drug trafficking, arms dealing, and money laundering.  Silva touched on arms trafficking when dealing with the crimes of Ivan Kharkov in The Defector and Moscow Rules.  Silva was also intrigued by the greed that drove people such as Bernie Madoff and he, and some other key figures in the Great Recession were the inspiration behind this book's villain, Martin Landesmann.

Reception

Like others in Silva's Gabriel Allon series, this book was a New York Times bestseller. The Rembrandt Affair marked Silva's last book with Putnam after he signed a deal with HarperCollins following Rembrandt's publication.

International titles
Portuguese: O Caso Rembrandt. (The Rembrandt Affair). (2011).

References

External links

Novels by Daniel Silva
2010 American novels
G. P. Putnam's Sons books